"Wouldn't It Be Nice" is a song by the American rock band the Beach Boys and the opening track from their 1966 album Pet Sounds. Written by Brian Wilson, Tony Asher, and Mike Love, it is distinguished for its sophisticated Wall of Sound-style arrangement and refined vocal performances, and is regarded among the band's finest songs. With its juxtaposition of joyous-sounding music and melancholic lyrics, it is considered a formative work of power pop, and with respect to musical innovation, progressive pop.

The song was inspired by Wilson's confused infatuations for his sister-in-law, who projected an "innocent aura" that he wished to capture in "Wouldn't It Be Nice". Lyrically, the song describes a young couple who feel empowered by their monogamous relationship and fantasize about the romantic freedom they would earn as adults. Like the other tracks on Pet Sounds, it subverted listeners' expectations, as past Beach Boys songs had normally celebrated superficial conceits such as material possessions and casual flings.

Wilson produced the record between January and April 1966 with his band and 16 studio musicians who variously played drums, timpani, glockenspiel, trumpet, saxophones, accordions, guitars, pianos, and upright bass. The harp-like instrument heard in the introduction is a 12-string mando-guitar plugged directly into the recording console. One section of the song engages in a ritardando, a device that is rarely used in pop music. The band struggled to sing the multiple vocal parts to Wilson's satisfaction, and the song ultimately took longer to record than any other track on the album.

"Wouldn't It Be Nice" was released as a single in July and peaked at number 8 on the Billboard Hot 100. It has occasionally appeared in the soundtracks of films such as the 1989 documentary Roger & Me, where it was used to underscore visuals of economic devastation. , it is the band's most streamed song on Spotify, and it is listed among the thousand-most highest rated songs of all time on Acclaimed Music.

Background

"Wouldn't It Be Nice" is one of the eight songs that Brian Wilson and Tony Asher wrote for the Pet Sounds album. Wilson's (since-discredited) 1991 memoir suggested that he was inspired to write the song after having sexual fantasies about the Honeys' singer Diane Rovell, his sister-in-law. While discussing the song, Asher supported that Wilson was "definitely infatuated by her" and "this innocent aura that she seemed to possess. Brian was really just so naive." Wilson repeatedly brought up the subject while they composed the songs on Pet Sounds, as Asher remembered, "He'd stop in the middle of writing a song or a conversation or whatever and start going on about Diane, about how innocent, sweet, and beautiful she was. I’d be thinking, 'Huh! Your wife’s in the next room, and you’re talking about her sister!'"

It was one of only two songs on Pet Sounds in which Asher wrote words to a melody that Wilson had already finalized, the other being "You Still Believe in Me". According to Asher, "Over a period of days, Brian kept saying that he was working on a melody, but he didn't want to play it for me until he had the structure finished. One day, he said, 'It's done.'" Wilson had decided on its subject matter: the "innocence of [...] being too young to get married", a topic that "seemed to be immensely appealing to him." Asher said that, after he had begun writing the lyrics, Wilson started "microanalyzing the individual words" to Asher's annoyance.  Following Asher's complaints, Wilson agreed to let Asher take a tape of the song home and write the words alone. Asher then returned with a set of lyrics, which the pair refined. It was a less integrated and collaborative process than the one for the songs they wrote afterward.

Mike Love's co-writing credit was not officially recognized until 1994, when he successfully sued for writing credits on 35 Beach Boys songs, including "Wouldn't It Be Nice". During the proceedings, Love's attorney proposed that, since Love had not been physically present when Asher and Wilson were writing the song, it may have been possible that Wilson consulted Love by telephone during occasional bathroom breaks. Asher later said it was an "absurd" argument. Asked in a 1996 interview to enumerate Love's contributions, Asher responded, "None, whatsoever." However, under oath, he stated that it consisted of the line "good night my baby / sleep tight, my baby" and possible minor vocal arrangement.

Lyrics

The lyrics describe a young couple fantasizing about the romantic freedom they would earn as adults, including the benefits of being able to "hold each other close the whole night through" and to "say goodnight and stay together". Asher explained, "It's a song that people who are young and in love can appreciate and respond to, because it revolves around the things they've always wanted to do: live together, sleep together, wake up together—do everything together."

In a 1976 radio interview, Wilson said the song expresses "the need to have the freedom to live with somebody [...] The idea is, the more we talk about it, the more we want it, but let's talk about it anyway. Let's talk it over, let's talk about what we might have if we really got down to it." In 1996, he reflected, "'Wouldn't It Be Nice' was not a real long song, but it's a very 'up' song. It expresses the frustrations of youth, what you can't have, what you really want and you have to wait for it."

Wilson had previously written a song with similar subject matter, "We'll Run Away", on All Summer Long (1964). He had also produced a rendition of the doo-wop standard "I'm So Young" for The Beach Boys Today! (1965). Journalist Nick Kent felt that, although Wilson had captured similar "teen angst dialogue" before: "This time [he] was out to eclipse these previous sonic soap operas, to transform the subject's sappy sentiments with a God-like grace so that the song would become a veritable pocket symphony." Musicologist Phillip Lambert called the themes "a significant twist" on the lyrics of Wilson's past songs, "which fantasized about material possessions [...] feats of physical skill [...] and one-night stands [...] Now the young lovers just want to be monogamous and draw strength and happiness from each other, 'in the kind of world where we belong.'"

Composition
"Wouldn't It Be Nice" begins with an eight-beat introduction in the key of A major. Following a single drum hit, the song shifts to the remote flat submediant key of F. Classical composer John Adams called this key change "nothing new in the classical or jazz world, but appearing here in the context of a standard rock-and-roll song, it felt novel and fresh. More than any other songwriter of that era, Brian Wilson understood the value of harmonic surprise."

The verse bass line was inspired by the Ronettes' "Be My Baby" (1963). Asked about the song's bass line, Wilson, explained, "It's just a feel you get. I sort of feel my way through the line. I can't explain how it's done, in terms of words. [The verses are] similar to the Phil Spector-type bass. It's a one-note walking bass that goes [singing with triplet feel:] 'Bom-buh-bum-bah, bom-buh-bum-bah...' It keeps going one scale tone up ['bah'], then down like a walking bass."

The next section modulates down a minor third, to D major, and contains the return of a melodic figure from the intro. After this section, the song repeats the end of the verse melody, but this time engages in a decrescendo and ritardando, a device that doesn't often appear in pop music, but does in classical music. At the end, the song returns to its original tempo and fades out. Asher commented, "I love the fact that the song has such a nice, bouncy feel to it. When we were writing, I was aware of the intricate rhythms that Brian had accomplished musically. There are changes in tempo and legato parts that make it very interesting."

Recording

Backing track
Instrumental tracking for "Wouldn't It Be Nice" began at 7:00p.m. on January 22, 1966 at Gold Star Studios. Wilson produced the session with engineer Larry Levine. The calliope-like instrument heard in the opening bars is an electric 12-string guitar plugged directly into the recording console. Due to recording logistics, this created an unusual situation in which the player had to perform the instrument in the control room, away from the rest of the musicians, who could not hear his playing in the regular recording space. The exception was drummer Hal Blaine, who wore headphones and was tasked with signaling the other musicians to play on cue. All of the instruments were played live in a continuous take, with no overdubs.

Much of the track's rhythmic accompaniment was provided by two accordions playing a shuffle beat in a manner similar to the band's "California Girls" (1965). Wilson recalled, "I had two accordion players playing at once, both playing the same thing and it just rang through the room, in the booth, and everyone was saying, 'What is that sound?'" During the second bridge, the players performed a technique known as a "triple bellow shake" to make the accordions sound like a violin.

Some of the charts that Wilson handed to his musicians were written in different keys from each other. Session musician Lyle Ritz, who was playing in D, mistook the arrangement as an error, as he recalled: "[The] rest of the band was in another key. I knew that was wrong. So during a break, I looked at everybody else's music to see if it was a mistake. Because you can't do that. But he [Brian] pulled it off." After recording 21 takes of the instrumental track, the session concluded at11:30 p.m. with a lead vocal overdub by Wilson. Wilson did not use Gold Star for any other song on the album except "I Just Wasn't Made for These Times".

Vocals and mixdown

The vocal sessions for Pet Sounds were the most challenging of the group's career, and their performance on "Wouldn't It Be Nice" took longer to record than any other track on the album, as Wilson's bandmates struggled to sing the multiple vocal parts to his satisfaction. Al Jardine later said that the challenge of meeting Wilson's standards on the song "was painful beyond belief for all of us." Carl Wilson remembered, "We really tried to make a good album. We wanted to take another step. 'Wouldn't It Be Nice' was the track that really brought that hope to all of us. We did at least ten sessions on that one, and it still wasn't right. I still think we sang it a little rushed."

Mike Love, who affectionately nicknamed Brian "the Stalin of the studio" during these sessions, said, "We did one passage of 'Wouldn't It Be Nice' close to 30 times—and some of the tries were nearly perfect! But Brian was looking for something more than the actual notes or the blend: he was reaching for something mystical—out of the range of hearing." Bruce Johnston similarly likened Wilson to General Patton. In his recollection, "We re-recorded our vocals for 'Wouldn't It Be Nice' so many times that the rhythm was never right. We'd slave [...] singing this thing and then Brian would say, 'No it's not right! It's just not right!'"

On February 16, Wilson created a rough mono mix of the song at United Western Recorders. Another mono mix with different, incomplete vocals was made on March 11, using the eight-track console at Columbia Studio. Further vocal overdubs were taped on March 10, followed by more rough mixes on March 22. The final round of vocal overdubs were recorded at Columbia on April 11 and shortly thereafter. According to Brian, "One of the features of this record is that Dennis sings [his harmony parts] in a special way, cupping his hands. I had thought for hours of the best way to achieve the sound and Dennis dug the idea because he knew it would work." Love developed the "Good night [...] " couplet during the studio sessions.

Like other tracks on the album, "Wouldn't It Be Nice" contains a prominent technical flaw in the final mix, in which an audible tape splice is heard between the chorus and Love's vocal entrance in the bridge. The error was mended on the track's 1996 stereo mix created by Mark Linett for The Pet Sounds Sessions. Linett explained, "The abrupt edit [...] was an edit that took an older mix with Mike Love singing and put it in the bridge. I didn't figure that out for years!" The 1996 stereo mix features Wilson singing the bridge because the tape with Love's singing was not available.

Release

"Wouldn't It Be Nice" was first released on May 14, 1966 as the opening track on Pet Sounds. In his self-described "unbiased" review of the album for Record Mirror, Norman Jopling said that the song "starts off prettily, and develops into a complicated ponderous beat number taken at a reasonably fast tempo. It slows down half-way through but brightens up again, and the lyric is pleasant. But not exceptional Beach Boys." Billboards terse review of the album, published uncharacteristically late, highlighted the track for its "strong single potential".  Cash Box described the song as a "rhythmic, medium-paced, danceable sincere pledge of devotion."

On July 18, the song was issued in the U.S. with the B-side "God Only Knows" as the third single from Pet Sounds.  In other countries, "Wouldn't It Be Nice" was issued as the B-side of "God Only Knows". It debuted on the US Billboard Hot 100 at number 26 on August 20, and it peaked at number 8 on September 17. Also in September, it peaked at number four in Canada and number two in Australia. In October, it peaked at number 12 in New Zealand.

Live performances

The Beach Boys adopted the song into their live performances, typically with Al Jardine handling the lead vocal originally sung by Wilson. They did not initially incorporate the tempo change into the live arrangement, and instead skipped that section entirely, as can be heard on the 1968 recording released on the live album Live in London (1970). In April 1971, a version recorded Live At Big Sur was released as a single. By the early 1970s, the group had begun playing the whole song in their live arrangement, as demonstrated on 1973's The Beach Boys in Concert.

Recognition and legacy
Writing in his 2012 book Fifty Sides of the Beach Boys, biographer Mark Dillon describes "Wouldn't It Be Nice" as perhaps the band's "most gloriously innocent song" and one of Wilson's "most adventurous" arrangements. Kent declared the harmonies to be "so complex they seemed to have more in common with a Catholic Mass than any cocktail lounge acappella doo-wop."

The song was influential to the development of the power pop style. Author Michael Chabon named it as a "founding document" of the genre, citing its "sadness and yearning [...] smuggled into the melody, the harmonies, the lyrics, and even the title, which marks the broken place, the gap between the wish and the world." Writing for Cleveland, Troy L. Smith said that it was one of the Pet Sounds tracks that "established the group as the forefathers of progressive pop", characterizing it as "a Wall of Sound style single that contains some of the best harmonizing in the history of music." Furthermore, he said that the song "was the first taste of progressive pop that would be picked up by the Beatles and the likes of Supertramp, Queen and others moving forward."

Among the artists that have afforded praise to "Wouldn't It Be Nice", Zooey Deschanel performed the song regularly at concerts with her band She & Him and said, "On the surface, it's a really well-crafted pop song, but then it has so many layers: production-wise, songwriting-wise, and lyrically. It's a perfect record." She added that her mind was "blown" by the vocals-only track included on The Pet Sounds Sessions box set. Singer Taylor Swift selected it as the song she would play for walking down the aisle in the event that she would ever get married. A 1977 live rendition by Alex Chilton – in which he jokingly introduces it as "a song by Charlie Manson" – was included on the posthumous release Ocean Club '77 (2015).

, "Wouldn't It Be Nice" is the Beach Boys' most streamed song on Spotify
and it is listed as the 965th highest rated song of all time on Acclaimed Music. In 2006, Pitchfork ranked it number seven on its list of "The 200 Best Songs of the 1960s". Contributor Joe Tangari wrote in its entry: "'Wouldn’t It Be Nice' has everything you love about the Beach Boys in spades [...] It’s the ultimate starry-eyed teenage symphony to God, and it perfectly captures the earnest devotion we only seem capable of in a small window of years." In 2008, Popdose staff members ranked it the 22nd-best single of the previous 50 years, writing that "no other song [...] so perfectly captures the idea of innocent love." National Review ranked it number five on a 2006 list of the greatest politically conservative rock songs, where it was described as "pro-abstinence and pro-marriage". In 2021, it was ranked number 297 on Rolling Stones list of "The 500 Greatest Songs of All Time".

Cultural responses
The song has occasionally appeared in the soundtracks of films such as Shampoo (1975), 50 First Dates (2004), and It's Complicated (2009).  In the 1989 documentary Roger & Me, it was used to underscore visuals of the economic devastation caused by the closure of several auto plants in Flint, Michigan. Critic Anthony Kaufman highlighted the scene as an especially effective piece of "ironic counterpoint". The band's film-themed compilation Still Cruisin' (1988) included the song for its appearance in The Big Chill (1983), although the compilers accidentally used an alternate mix of the track with a different vocal take.

In 1990, the political cartoon strip Doonesbury ran a controversial story arc involving the character Andy Lippincott and his terminal battle with AIDS. It concludes with Lippincott expressing his admiration for Pet Sounds and, in the last panels, depicts the character's death while listening to "Wouldn't It Be Nice", as well as his last written words, the line "Brian Wilson is God" scrawled on a notebook (a reference to the line "Clapton is God"). According to cultural theorist Kirk Curnett in 2012, the panel "remains one of the most iconic in Doonesburys forty-three year history, often credit[ed] with helping humanize AIDS victims when both gay and straight sufferers were severely stigmatized." Curnett also noted that while "[i]t may overstate the case to describe [the song] as a gay anthem", it had been used at recent LGBT rallies.

Personnel
Per band archivist Craig Slowinski.The Beach Boys Mike Love – bridge and outro lead vocals, backing vocals
 Al Jardine – backing vocals
 Bruce Johnston – backing vocals
 Brian Wilson – lead vocals, backing vocals
 Carl Wilson – backing vocals
 Dennis Wilson – backing vocalsSession musicians (also known as "the Wrecking Crew")

 Hal Blaine – drums
 Frank Capp – timpani, jingle stick, glockenspiel
 Roy Caton – trumpet
 Jerry Cole – 12-string lead guitar
 Steve Douglas – tenor saxophone
 Carl Fortina – accordion
 Plas Johnson – tenor saxophone
 Carol Kaye – bass guitar
 Barney Kessel – 12-string mando-guitar
 Larry Knechtel – tack piano
 Al de Lory – grand piano
 Frank Marocco – accordion
 Jay Migliori – baritone saxophone
 Bill Pitman – acoustic rhythm guitar
 Ray Pohlman – Danelectro 6-string bass
 Lyle Ritz – string bassTechnical staff'
 Larry Levine – engineer (instrumental session)
 Ralph Valentin – engineer (vocal session)
 Don T. — second engineer (vocal session)

Charts and certifications

Notes

References

Bibliography

External links
 Making of the studio recording
 
 
 
 

1966 singles
1966 songs
American power pop songs
Avant-pop songs
The Beach Boys songs
Capitol Records singles
Progressive pop songs
Songs about marriage
Song recordings produced by Brian Wilson
Songs used as jingles
Songs written by Brian Wilson
Songs written by Mike Love
Songs written by Tony Asher
Song recordings with Wall of Sound arrangements